The ARIA Digital Album Chart ranks the best-performing albums and extended plays (EPs) in Australia. Its data, published by the Australian Recording Industry Association, is based collectively on the weekly  digital sales of albums and EPs.

Chart history

Number-one artists

See also
2017 in music
ARIA Charts
List of number-one singles of 2017 (Australia)

References

Digital 2017
Australia digital albums
Number-one digital albums